David M. Gordon (1944 – March 16, 1996) was an American economist and Professor of Economics at the Graduate Faculty of the New School for Social Research. He founded the Institute for Labor Education and Research in 1975 and later the Schwartz Center for Economic Policy Analysis in New York City. Gordon worked to disseminate progressive economic ideas to the general public and to contribute to the development of a left-political movement in the United States. Gordon's work dealt mainly with discrimination and labor market segmentation. He coined the term social structure of accumulation which gave rise to an extensive body of work on the impact of political, social and economic institutions on long-term investment and growth.

Biography 
Gordon was born in Washington, D.C., grew up and went to high school in Berkeley, California and spent his college years at Harvard University, where he was awarded a B.A. in Economics in 1965. His father Robert Aaron Gordon was President of the American Economic Association. His mother Margaret S. Gordon was well known for her contributions to the economics of employment and social welfare policy. His brother Robert J. Gordon is a prominent macroeconomist.

As a graduate student of economics at Harvard in the late 1960s, Gordon worked as a research assistant evaluating Great Society programs targeting the hard-core unemployed and was active in the development of the new U.S. school of radical political economy. He completed a doctoral thesis on "Class, Productivity, and the Ghetto" and earned his Ph.D. in economics in 1971. From 1970 to 1973, he served as a research associate at the National Bureau for Economic Research, then located in New York City.  In 1973, he joined the Economics Department at the Graduate Faculty of the New School for Social Research, where he continued to teach until his untimely death—from congestive heart failure—at the age of 51.

Gordon's career was marked both by an extraordinary range of academic contributions to the field of economics and by his continual commitment to develop and to make available to the general public, economic analyses that could support the work of political activists working for social justice. His academic contributions are reflected in numerous books and articles published in professional journals as well as in his founding and directorship of the Center for Economic Policy Analysis. His contributions to the development of a progressive political movement in the United States include many policy papers, newsletters, op-ed pieces, radio and TV interviews and frequent participation in public discussion forums as well as the founding of the Institute for Labor Education and Research—subsequently renamed the Center for Democratic Alternatives—in New York City. Gordon Hall is the home of the University of Massachusetts Political Economy Research Institute.

Work 
Gordon's progressive political commitments were the basic reason for his research activity and determined both its major themes and the manner in which he presented his findings. He addressed most of his research to economic issues of importance to the average person and to workers in particular. He disseminated his research findings not only to professional colleagues in economics journals, but also to a wide popular audience in a highly readable style. In his life and in his work as an economist, Gordon exemplified the waning tradition of the public intellectual.

Gordon's work over the three decades since he began graduate study can be divided into three periods, during which he addressed different sets of issues. From the late 1960s to the late 1970s, often working in collaboration with Richard Edwards and Michael Reich, he focused on labor economics and in particular segmented labor markets. During the 1980s, he turned his attention to analysis of the long-term trajectory of the U.S. economy, working with Samuel Bowles and Thomas Weisskopf to develop an historical and institutional approach to macroeconomic analysis that would yield progressive economic policy proposals. Finally from the late 1980s through the mid-1990s, Gordon worked to develop a neo-Marxian model of the U.S. macroeconomy and brought to a conclusion his ongoing analysis of the implications of widespread bureaucratic supervision of American workplaces.

Labor economics 
As a graduate student, Gordon combined some of his own findings with related work by other economists to write Theories of Poverty and Underemployment (1971), a book that surveyed alternative approaches to problems of urban poverty. His best-known contributions to labor economics challenged the mainstream economic assumption of a unified labor market and argued instead for the recognition of multiple labor markets separated by deep historically-shaped divisions along racial, gender and class lines. Gordon's joint research with Edwards and Reich in this area culminated in the publication of their co-authored and widely cited book, Segmented Work, Divided Workers: The Historical Transformation of Labor in the United States (1982).

Macroeconomic analysis and economic policy 
In 1979, Gordon became co-chair of a commission on economic problems set up by the Progressive Alliance—a political coalition of more than 200 organizations representing labor, citizens, civil rights and women's organizations. He felt that a new and overarching analysis of the U.S. economy was needed in order to understand the macroeconomic travails of the time and to guide proposals for change. This led to more than a decade of collaboration with Samuel Bowles and Thomas Weisskopf in which they first analyzed the post-World War II boom of the U.S. economy as well as its subsequent unraveling and then formulated policy proposals to develop a more democratic, egalitarian and successful U.S. economy in the future. Gordon, Bowles and Weisskopf's account of the unraveling of the postwar boom gives prominence to the institutional and political impact of sustained full employment during the middle-to-late 1960s, the erosion of U.S. world hegemony and the rise of environmental and other citizen movements. In brief, they argue that the boom ended because the institutional structures could no longer restrain the claims of rivals (both domestic and international) against the profits of U.S. corporations and that a new and more just social and economic order would be needed to restore prosperity. Gordon's work with Bowles and Weisskopf led to numerous econometric and historical studies on the dynamics of stagflation, the slowdown of productivity growth and the determinants of profitability and investment which were published in a series of articles in economics journals. The collaboration also led to two co-authored books for a general audience, namely Beyond the Waste Land: A Democratic Alternative to Economic Decline (1983) and After the Waste Land: A Democratic Economics for the Year 2000 (1991).

Macroeconomic modeling and labor control 
One of Gordon's most important contributions to the collaborative research he carried out on labor economics and macroeconomic trends was his historical and institutional understanding of the process of economic growth and development. His approach sought to explain successive booms and crises in a capitalist economy in terms of successive institutional frameworks or, to use the neo-Marxian term, successive social structures of accumulation (SSAs). In the late 1980s and early 1990s, he sought to use statistical methodology to conduct a rigorous test of this historical-institutional approach.  His project involved the specification of four distinct yet comparable econometric models of the U.S. economy, based respectively on the neoclassical, the classical Marxian, the post-Keynesian and his own neo-Marxian "left-structuralist" perspective—the latter representing a formalization of the SSA approach. From a "forecasting tournament" among the four models, his own left-structuralist model emerged the winner.

Gordon's last five years were devoted also to completing an analysis of the top-heavy bureaucratic structure of U.S. corporations and its relationship to the decline in the real wages of U.S. workers since the mid-1970s—two phenomena on which he had focused attention in his earlier work. This effort culminated in the publication two months after his death of Fat and Mean: The Corporate Squeeze of Working Americans and the Myth of Managerial 'Downsizing''' (1996). In this book, Gordon refutes with an impressive array of quantitative evidence much of the conventional wisdom about U.S. corporate management and its relations with workers. He argues that U.S. corporations have gone "mean" rather than "lean", employing more managers and supervisors per worker than ever before. He attributes the long-term squeeze on U.S. workers' real wages not so much to increasing international economic integration and increasingly complex technology as to corporate executives' choice of a "low-road" business strategy, involving the use of discipline and negative sanctions, rather than a "high-road" strategy, emphasizing positive incentives to motivate work. Always concerned to use understanding of the world in order to change it for the better, Gordon concluded the book with a chapter devoted to policy recommendations designed to promote more democratic and cooperative high-road approaches to labor management.

 Works 
 
 
 
 Also as 
 
 

 References 
 Notes

 Further reading
 Boshey, Heather; Pressman, Steven (2009). "The Economic Contributions of David M. Gordon". Leading contemporary economists : economics at the cutting edge. London and New York: Routledge. .

 External links 
 Uchitelle, Louis (March 19, 1996). "David M. Gordon, 51, a Leader Among Left-Wing Economists". The New York Times''.
 Works by and about David M. Gordon on WorldCat.
 Schwartz Center for Economic Policy Analysis. Part of The New School.

1944 births
1996 deaths
Marxian economists
Berkeley High School (Berkeley, California) alumni
The New School faculty
Harvard College alumni
Economists from New York (state)
People from Washington, D.C.
20th-century American economists
Harvard Graduate School of Arts and Sciences alumni